European Science Editing is a peer-reviewed open access academic journal published by the European Association of Science Editors. It covers all aspects of scientific editing and publishing. The journal publishes research articles, meeting reports, essays and viewpoints, book and website reviews, as well as highlighting events, resources, and publications of interest to members. The editor-in-chief is Ksenija Baždarić (University of Rijeka).

History
The journal was established in 1975 as Earth Science Editing, published by the European Association of Earth Science Editors. In 1977 it was renamed Earth & Life Science Editing, obtaining its current title in 1986. The journal was issued triannually until 2001, when it moved to a quarterly schedule. Originally, the publication served as a newsletter to the association, before becoming an academic journal in 2002. In 2020 the journal became fully open access and online only. The journal does not charge any article processing charges.

Abstracting and indexing
The journal is abstracted and indexed in Library and Information Science Abstracts, Modern Language Association Database, and Scopus.

See also
Association of Learned and Professional Society Publishers
Committee on Publication Ethics
Council of Science Editors
European Medical Writers Association
International Committee of Medical Journal Editors
Mediterranean Editors and Translators
World Association of Medical Editors

References

External links

Publications established in 1975
English-language journals
Media studies journals
Academic journals published by learned and professional societies
Creative Commons Attribution-licensed journals